Sir Richard Gethin, 1st Baronet (c.1615 – 1679) was an Anglo-Irish politician.

Gethin was the Member of Parliament for Clonmel in the Irish House of Commons from 1639 to 1649. Following the Stuart Restoration, he was granted land in Fermoy, County Cork on the condition that he establish an English colony there; he subsequently named the manor Gethinsgrott. Between 1661 and 1666 he represented Newtown Limavady in the Irish Commons. On 1 August 1665 Gethin was created a baronet, of Gethinsgrott in the Baronetage of Ireland, by Charles II of England. In 1675 he was made a member of the Privy Council of Ireland.

He was succeeded in his title by his grandson, also called Richard.

References

Year of birth uncertain
1679 deaths
17th-century Anglo-Irish people
Baronets in the Baronetage of Ireland
Irish MPs 1639–1649
Irish MPs 1661–1666
Members of the Parliament of Ireland (pre-1801) for County Londonderry constituencies
Members of the Parliament of Ireland (pre-1801) for County Tipperary constituencies
Members of the Privy Council of Ireland